Fully Charged (also called The Fully Charged Show) is a YouTube channel, podcast, website, and live event focusing on electric vehicles and renewable energy founded by writer, broadcaster and actor Robert Llewellyn. Llewellyn would later become Joint CEO of Fully Charged with Dan Caesar and Caesar also presents many of the episodes of the show. They are both joined by many regular presenters along with guest presenters from many different countries. The channel has covered a wide range of topics around electric vehicles including electric cars, electric bikes, electric aircraft, and electric vehicle charging infrastructure. Fully Charged also covers a wide range of renewable energy topics including solar power, wind power, UK energy policy, cycling infrastructure, air pollution and air pollution monitoring.

Fully Charged began in 2010 and has since amassed more than 974,000 subscribers and 159 million views as of November 2022 with over 700 episodes. The channel is viewer supported through the crowdfunding platform Patreon or can be supported through a YouTube channel premium membership which provides access to Fully Charged Plus. The channel was previously supported through advertising and partnerships with Ecotricity, Bosch and British Gas.

Fully Charged also produces a weekly podcast discussing news and current topics not covered by the videos. In May 2019 a second YouTube channel, named Fully Charged Plus (formerly Fully Charged Regen), was launched with the purpose of uploading all the podcast episodes in YouTube video format, and releasing other longer-format videos such as talks and lectures, different from the usual episodes. In October of 2022, the second YouTube channel was renamed to Everything Electric Show with a focus on home energy systems and solutions.

Presenters

Additional current presenters include Dan Caesar (Joint CEO), Elliot Richards, Imogen Pierce, and many guest presenters from around the world working closely with a production crew of 12 people. Previous regular presenters include former Top Gear presenter Rory Reid and Jonny Smith a former presenter of Fifth Gear.

Fully Charged Live

The inaugural Fully Charged Live event, was held at Silverstone Circuit over the weekend of 9-10 June 2018.  The event included panel discussions, presentations, exhibitions stalls from vendors and sponsors, and vehicle displays.  Attendance at the event exceeded Llewellyn's expectations - attracting over 6,000 people.  This event introduced physicist Dr Helen Czerski as a presenter of the team. 

In 2019 the event took place in Silverstone on 7–9 June, and the first event in the United States, titled Fully Charged Live USA, was at Circuit of the Americas near Austin, Texas on 1–2 February 2020. After a year of lockdown the event continued at Farnborough International in 2021 with over 16,000 attending and Fully Charged continues to host many shows each year at different locations around the world.

Episodes

2019 – present 

From 2019 to present Fully Charged has greatly expanded the number of episodes being presented which include the main Fully Charged Show, the members only Fully Charged Plus channel, and a weekly podcast broadcast on different podcast platforms.

2018

2017

2016

2015

2014

2013

2012

2011

2010

Notes 
Footnotes

References

External links
 
 Fully Charged (Main YouTube channel)
 Fully Charged Podcasts
 Everything Electric Show (Second YouTube channel)

British non-fiction web series
Driving in the United Kingdom
YouTube channels